The President Abraham Lincoln Hotel, a DoubleTree by Hilton is a downtown hotel, in Springfield, Illinois. It is the only hotel connected to the Bank of Springfield Convention Center, via a tunnel. Because of this, it was able to be financed through loans backed by the State of Illinois. That fact would later be important when the loans were defaulted.

When the hotel opened in 1985, it was known as the Ramada Renaissance, then changed names to the President Abraham Lincoln Hotel & Conference Center in 2005. It became part of the DoubleTree by Hilton franchise in 2013.

History 
The Springfield Metropolitan Exposition and Auditorium Authority (SMEAA) began planning to build a convention center in Springfield in the early 1970s. It would later become the Prairie Capital Convention Center, and ground was broken in mid 1975.  Prior the ground breaking, proposals were sought for a hotel to be adjacent to the center. Of the 11 companies interested in the project, only two submitted plans. In March 1979,  New Frontier Development submitted the winning bid to build the 300 room hotel, at approximately $10 million. Early discussions indicated that an air rights leasing deal would be made with the hotel, with rent of $120,000 per year and an exclusive catering contract with the center. The Center opened in the fall of  1979.

New Frontier Development, headed by William F. Cellini, created a company known as President Lincoln Venture in order to fund the building development of the hotel. President Lincoln Hotel Venture borrowed about $24 million to build and furnish the hotel. That money included the $15.5 million state-backed mortgage, the $3.1 million low-interest loan from the city through the federal urban development grant, and about $5.4 million borrowed by President Lincoln Hotel Venture from the Lyons Trust and Savings Bank of Hinsdale. In addition, the hotel developers invested about $7 million of their own money.

Initial plans were for the hotel be affiliated with the Radisson Hotel chain. However, in April 1983, the decision was made to change the affiliation to Ramada, and its upscale Renaissance Hotel brand. Construction began in February 1984, and Jones-Blythe, of Springfield was the General Contractor and the architect was Nagle Hartray and Associates of Chicago.

Opening 
Grand opening was Friday, August 30, 1985. Then-governor, Jim Thompson, was among those at the dedication ceremony. The marble floors were imported from Italy. So was the Murano-glass chandelier—the glass was originally manufactured on an island off of Venice. The Axminster carpet came from Great Britain. At the time of the opening, the hotel featured two restaurants and two bars. Lindsay's Gallery, one of the two restaurants was named in honor of Springfield poet Vachel Lindsay. Displayed at the entrance to the restaurant was an 8-foot rendition of Lindsay's 1913 painting, "The Wedding of the Rose and the Lotus."

The hotel's other restaurant was the Floreale Room. It featured Northern Italian cuisine and was named after the Italian word for “the flower.” That restaurant would later close in August 1997. The Globe Tavern, an upper-level bar, is named after the Springfield inn where Abraham Lincoln once stayed.

Two suites furnished with rare antiques cost $275 per night. Rooms started at $65 per night. The average construction cost of the 320-room, $28.5 million hotel was $89,000 per room.

Problems with debt 
While the hotel made payments to its state loan initially, it fell behind in payments just two years after opening. In 1990, the state restructured the loan to require payments only when the hotel made a profit. In 1997 regular payments stopped; two payments of less than $143,000 were made in 2002.

In February 1997, Marriott bought the Renaissance chain, dropping the word Ramada from its name. However, Marriott failed to renew the franchise agreement in 2005, and the hotel name was changed to the President Abraham Lincoln Hotel and Conference Center.

The state foreclosed on the property in 2008. Principal and interest owed to the state totaled $30 million, according to the state treasurer's office. The state treasurer's office took over the property as part of foreclosure proceedings. A court-appointed receiver, Hostmark Hospitality Group, formally took over operations of the President Abraham Lincoln Hotel and Conference Center, prompting Gov. Rod Blagojevich to lift a ban on state employees staying there.  The state spent $375,000 on improvements, including new furnishings and mattress replacements.

Sale to Horve 
In 2009, the state put the hotel up for sale, there were five bidders. Steve Horve, whose family also owns hotels in Decatur, Forsyth and Champaign, as well as one in Dearborn, Mich., submitted a successful bid of $6.5 million for the 315-room hotel.

The sale was finalized in January 2010, and Mr. Horve began improvements to the hotel within a few months. The renovations took nearly 2 years, and included replacing all the laundry equipment.

In 2013, the hotel joined Hilton Worldwide, as a DoubleTree by Hilton property. The name of the hotel was “soft branded” as The President Abraham Lincoln Hotel, a DoubleTree by Hilton. Around the same time, the Prairie Capital Convention Center finished a two-year upgrade to its facilities.

Sale to Al Habtoor Group 
Al Habtoor Group, headed by multi-billionaire Khalaf Ahmad al Habtoor, made an unsolicited bid to buy the hotel in October 2014. Horve decided to sell the hotel to concentrate on his other hotel projects, including construction of a Home 2 extended-stay hotel by Hilton in Champaign. According to the Sangamon County recorder's office, Al Habtoor paid $9.3 million.

This is the first hotel Al Habtoor Group owns in the United States. Al Habtoor made his fortune in the construction business. Al Habtoor Group now has expanded to include hotel, automotive, real estate, education, insurance and publishing businesses worldwide, according to the company website. A decision was made to allow Hilton Management Services to operate the hotel.

Former Lincoln Hotel 
This is the second hotel in Springfield to be named after the 16th President. Another 13 story hotel, known as the Abraham Lincoln Hotel, opened in 1926 and closed for business in 1964. It was torn down in a controlled implosion on December 17, 1978. The building was destroyed to make way for a courts complex, which never materialized. To this day, the lot remains vacant and undeveloped.

Facilities and amenities 
The building is 12 stories, and contains 310 guest rooms. The layout of the floors is:
 The first floor (street level) contains the lobby, front desk, a small gift shop. It also has the Presidential Ballroom, Lindsay's Restaurant (breakfast), The Globe Tavern (lunch and dinner), and the Lincoln meeting room.
 The second floor contains meeting rooms, and the hotel's executive offices. It is connected to the first floor via a grand staircase.
 Floors 3 through 12 are guest floors.
 The Concourse level includes the Fitness Center (open 24 hours), an indoor swimming pool, and a tunnel which connects directly to the Convention Center.

References

Further reading
 
 
 
 
 
 
 
 
 
 
 
 
 

Hilton Hotels & Resorts hotels
DoubleTree hotels
Buildings and structures in Springfield, Illinois
Hotel buildings completed in 1985
1985 establishments in Illinois